Detective Pikachu (also known as Pokémon Detective Pikachu and released as  in Japan after the original game) is a 2019 mystery fantasy comedy film directed by Rob Letterman. Based on the Pokémon franchise, the film is a loose adaptation of the 2016 video game of the same name. It was written by Letterman, Dan Hernandez, Benji Samit, and Derek Connolly, from a story by Hernandez, Samit, and Nicole Perlman, and produced by Legendary Pictures and Toho. It was the first live-action Pokémon film and the first live-action film based on a Nintendo game property since Super Mario Bros. (1993).

Ryan Reynolds stars as the voice and facial motion capture of Pikachu, with Justice Smith, Kathryn Newton, Suki Waterhouse, Omar Chaparro, Chris Geere, Ken Watanabe, and Bill Nighy in live-action roles. The plot follows former Pokémon trainer Tim Goodman and the titular Pokémon as they attempt to solve the mysterious disappearance of Tim's father, Harry.

Filming took place from January to May 2018 in Colorado, England, and Scotland. Detective Pikachu was released in Japan on May 3, 2019 and in the United States on May 10, 2019, distributed by Warner Bros. Pictures in RealD 3D, Dolby Cinema, IMAX, 4DX, and ScreenX formats. It is the first Pokémon film distributed theatrically in the United States since Pokémon Heroes (2003) and the first distributed by Warner Bros. since Pokémon 3 (2001). The film received praise for the visual effects and Reynolds' performance, but criticism towards the story. It made a worldwide gross of $433 million. It is the second-highest grossing video game film adaptation behind Warcraft, also produced by Legendary Pictures. A sequel is in development.

Plot

Tim Goodman gave up his dream of being a Pokémon trainer following the death of his mother and his estrangement from his father Harry, a police detective. He is contacted by the police of Ryme City, where humans and Pokémon live together in harmony and Pokémon battles are illegal. He is informed by Harry's friend, Detective Hideo Yoshida, that Harry was killed in a car accident. Tim goes to Harry's apartment to sort things out and meets Harry's police partner, a deerstalker-clad amnesiac Pikachu, whom only Tim can understand. Tim accidentally releases a mysterious purple gas known as "R" from a vial he finds in Harry's office; they are then attacked by a party of Aipom who became rabid under the gas's influence.

Pikachu believes that Harry survived the crash, as the police never found his body. They meet an informant of Harry's, a Mr. Mime, who directs them to an illegal underground Pokémon battle arena. The arena is raided by police and Tim is brought to Yoshida, who reveals footage of Harry's crash, explaining that Harry having survived would have been impossible.

Tim and Pikachu are contacted by Howard Clifford, the founder of Clifford Industries and creator of Ryme City. Howard reveals that Harry was abducted by a genetically engineered Pokémon called Mewtwo, who erased Pikachu's memory of the incident. He warns Tim that his son, Roger Clifford, is behind the creation of the R gas. Tim and Pikachu recruit aspiring journalist Lucy Stevens and her Psyduck and travel to the abandoned genetics laboratory Harry was investigating, where they are attacked by genetically enhanced Greninja. They manage to escape, but Pikachu is injured in the attack. A Bulbasaur leads them to Mewtwo, and despite Tim's objections, Mewtwo heals Pikachu. This causes Pikachu to remember that he helped Mewtwo escape from the lab and believes he was responsible for betraying Harry. Not trusting himself, he leaves Tim.

Pikachu discovers the scene of the crash and finds evidence that the Greninja, not Mewtwo, were responsible for the crash. Back in Ryme City, Roger exposes himself as the mastermind behind the "R" gas and the Mewtwo experiments. He explains that Mewtwo can fuse humans with their Pokémon, but only if the Pokémon is in a crazed state, thus the need for R. Roger uses a device to transfer his consciousness into Mewtwo, unleashes the gas on the city from giant balloons, and starts fusing humans with Pokémon, including Lucy and Yoshida. Pikachu arrives and fights Mewtwo, while Tim discovers that Roger is a shape-shifting Ditto, and that the real Roger was tied up and gagged by his father. They eventually defeat Howard by removing the headset on his head, freeing Mewtwo from his control. Mewtwo separates the people and their Pokémon, Howard is arrested, and Roger vows to fix his father's mistakes.

Mewtwo explains that Harry had tried to save him from Howard and helped him escape, but was attacked by the Greninja. Mewtwo had decided to heal Harry's wounded body while Pikachu had volunteered to have himself fuse his consciousness with Harry's to continue their investigation, the experience erasing both their memories. Mewtwo separates the two and Tim reunites with Harry in his human body. Tim decides to stay in Ryme City to become a detective and spend more time with his father and Pikachu.

Cast
 Ryan Reynolds as: 
 Detective Pikachu, a world-class detective and exceptionally intelligent talking Pikachu whom only Tim can understand. Reynolds performed both the voice and facial motion capture for the character.
 Ikue Ōtani provides Detective Pikachu's normal voice as heard by the citizens of Ryme City other than Tim. Ōtani reprises her role from the Pokémon animated series and video games.
 Harry Goodman, Tim's missing widowed father and a Ryme City police detective.
 Justice Smith as Tim Goodman, a former aspiring Pokémon trainer and insurance agent looking for his missing father. He is also Detective Pikachu's partner and the only person capable of hearing him speak.
 Max Fincham as Young Tim Goodman.
 Kathryn Newton as Lucy Stevens, a junior reporter who is accompanied by a Psyduck.
 Suki Waterhouse as Ms. Norman/Ditto, Howard's genetically modified Ditto who poses as a female bodyguard while hiding her eyes with sunglasses.
 Omar Chaparro as Sebastian, a Pokémon trainer who runs a secret Ryme City Pokémon battle arena and is accompanied by a Charizard.
 Chris Geere as Roger Clifford, Howard's son who is president of CMN and Clifford Industries.
 Ken Watanabe as Detective Hideo Yoshida, a veteran Ryme City police lieutenant and friend of Harry who is accompanied by a Snubbull. Watanabe also voiced his own lines in the Japanese version.
 Bill Nighy as Howard Clifford, Roger's father and the disabled visionary behind Ryme City and founder of Clifford Industries.
 Rita Ora as Dr. Ann Laurent, a scientist for Clifford Enterprises experimenting on Mewtwo.
 Karan Soni as Jack, Tim's friend who is a Pokémon trainer and encourages him to catch a Cubone.
 Josette Simon as "Grams", Tim's grandmother who took care of him after the death of her daughter (Tim's mother).
 Rina Hoshino and Kotaro Watanabe as Mewtwo, a human-made Pokémon that was targeted by Howard Clifford for its abilities.
 Rachael Lillis as Jigglypuff (Via archive voice recording)

Additionally, Diplo appears as the DJ who performs at Sebastian's Pokémon arena. Ryoma Takeuchi, who provides the Japanese dubbed voice of Tim, has a cameo as a Pokémon trainer in a video Tim watches. In a deleted scene, Rob Delaney appears as a co-worker of Tim at the insurance company. Ralph Foody and Michael Guido respectively appear as Johnny and Snakes, characters from the Home Alone film within a film Angels with Filthy Souls, via archive footage from the former film.

Production

Development
The film was officially announced in July 2016, although Legendary Pictures were reported to be in talks as early as April of that year. The Pokémon Company and Letterman wanted to adapt Detective Pikachu because of their interest in making a film that focused on another character besides Ash Ketchum, the protagonist of the Pokémon animated TV series. On the premise, Letterman stated, "The Pokémon Company, they've already made many, many movies of Ash, and they came to Legendary with this idea of using a new character. So when I came onboard, I was pitched this character of Detective Pikachu, and I fell in love with the story behind it." The idea of talking Pokémon originated from an early concept for the 1990s TV series, but was scrapped when the original game developer, Game Freak, was unsatisfied with the concept. The idea was revived for the 2016 Detective Pikachu spin-off game. Letterman said that they "spent a year designing all the characters ahead of shooting so that we could get it all right".

On November 30, 2016, Rob Letterman was hired to direct the film, and the studio fast-tracked production to start in 2017. On August 16, 2016, Nicole Perlman and Gravity Falls creator Alex Hirsch were in negotiations with Legendary to write the screenplay. Later revisions were provided by Eric Pearson, Thomas McCarthy, Derek Connolly, Dan Hernandez, Benji Samit and Letterman. Ultimately, Hernandez, Samit, Letterman, and Connolly received screenplay credit, and with Hernandez, Samit and Perlman receiving "story by" billing.

Casting
In November 2017, Justice Smith was cast in the lead human role, with Kathryn Newton added to costar after an intense session of reading and testing actresses opposite Smith. Newton beat out Natalia Dyer, Haley Lu Richardson, and Katherine Langford for the role. In December 2017, Ryan Reynolds was cast in the title role, portrayed via motion-capture and voice over. Other actors considered for the role of Pikachu were Danny DeVito, Dwayne Johnson, Mark Wahlberg and Hugh Jackman. In January 2018, with production commencing, Ken Watanabe, Bill Nighy and Chris Geere joined the cast, followed by Suki Waterhouse and Rita Ora in February and Omar Chaparro in April. In January 2019, Rob Delaney had previously stated that he had a role, but he does not appear in the final cut of the film.

Filming
Principal production began on January 15, 2018, in London, England and Denver, Colorado. Nine days later, Legendary announced that principal photography had officially begun. Much of the on set interaction and vocal reference for Pikachu was filled in by Jon Bailey. However, all of his dialogue was dubbed over by Ryan Reynolds. Principal photography concluded on May 1, 2018. Some filming took place at Shepperton Studios, Warner Bros. Studios, Leavesden, and Minley Woods in Hampshire, rural areas of Colorado, just outside Denver and Colorado Springs; and Scotland. Filming also took place on Anchor Wharf at the Chatham Historic Dockyard in Kent.

The film's cinematographer, John Mathieson, noted that, like his other films, Detective Pikachu was shot on traditional film, in contrast to most other contemporary films which are shot digitally. He said the use of traditional film helps make it "look more realistic".

Post-production
The film's visual effects were provided by the Moving Picture Company (MPC), Framestore, Image Engine, Rodeo FX, and Instinctual VFX. Much of the visual effects were provided by the same team behind The Jungle Book, Fantastic Beasts and Where to Find Them, and The Lion King. Letterman compared the visual effects to the character of Rocket Raccoon from Guardians of the Galaxy: "They're technically, some of the most high-end visual effects in the world... It's completely photo-realistic, like they are alive and in the movie." Additional audio recording of a fight between Detective Pikachu and Charizard was recorded during the 2018 Pokémon World Championships.

Music

Henry Jackman, who previously worked with Letterman on Monsters vs. Aliens (2009) and Gulliver's Travels (2010), provided the score for the film and arranged Junichi Masuda's "Red & Blue Theme" for the film's end credits.

Kygo and Rita Ora released a standalone single for the film, titled "Carry On". The song and the music video were released on April 19, 2019.  Honest Boyz also collaborated with Lil Uzi Vert to make another song for the film, titled "Electricity" and produced by Pharrell Williams, which also plays over the end credits.

Marketing
In early November 2018, with the film in the post-production phase, a screen test was held for an incomplete version of the film, which drew positive reactions from the test audience.

The film's first official trailer was released on November 12, 2018. Warner Bros. revealed versions of the trailer in English along with dubbed versions in Spanish, French, Italian and German. It soon became the top trending video on YouTube, and a top trending topic on Twitter, while inspiring numerous internet memes and reaction videos. Within 24 hours, the high-concept trailer amassed more than 100 million views across multiple online and social media platforms. On YouTube, the English-language trailer garnered over 1million likes within two days, and 1.22 million likes within five days. On Twitter, it set a new record of over 400,000 mentions on the day of the trailer reveal. The film was supported by a $100 million marketing budget.

On November 30, 2018, Letterman, Smith, and Newton appeared on stage during the Tokyo Comic-Con event.

On May 7, 2019, a Warner Bros. YouTube channel named "Inspector Pikachu" uploaded a video purporting to be a bootleg recording of the film. Spanning nearly 1.75 hours in length, the opening minute shows the production logo sequences followed by a scene from the film featuring Tim Goodman, before spending the remainder of its runtime depicting Pikachu performing aerobics to an upbeat, 1980s-inspired synthwave tune. Reynolds aided in the prank, posting on Twitter as if he was alerting Warner Bros. and the film's official accounts about the alleged bootleg. The video, which Paul Tassi of Forbes described as "brilliant", received 4.2 million views in less than a day.

Merchandise and other tie-ins
On March 15, 2019, it was revealed that Legendary will release a graphic novel based on the film.
Niantic Labs promoted the film through the Pokémon Go app, by featuring, among other things, select Pokémon from the movie appear in the game, including a limited edition "detective" version of Pikachu. The Pokémon Company released a series of trading cards featuring images from the film, including a limited edition Detective Pikachu card only available the first weekend of the film's release. Along with TCG booster pack sets, they produced a limited edition Detective Pikachu Cafe Figure Collection bundle. A set of 6 Detective Pikachu toys were also sold at Burger King. Wicked Cool Toys, the current toy partner for the franchise, released figures and plush toys for retail as well.

Release

Theatrical

Japan
Initially, Universal Pictures was due to handle distribution outside Japan, while Toho would handle the Japanese distribution. On July 25, 2018, Warner Bros. announced they had taken over worldwide distribution duties (except in Japan and China) from Universal, with the release date unchanged. Warner Bros. also got the film rights for the Pokémon franchise for 30 years. The film received a PG rating from the MPAA, it is the first Pokémon film released in the United States not to receive a G rating.

When the film's Japanese release was announced on November 29, 2018, Ryoma Takeuchi was confirmed to voice Tim Goodman in the Japanese version. Takeuchi also has a brief cameo appearance in the film itself as a Pokémon trainer. On March 20, 2019, it was confirmed that Marie Iitoyo would voice Lucy Stevens and Ken Watanabe would reprise his role as Detective Yoshida, in the Japanese dub. When the film premiered in Japan on May 3, 2019, Hidetoshi Nishijima was confirmed to have voiced Detective Pikachu in the Japanese dub.

International
The US premiere was held on May 3, 2019, in New York and featured a yellow carpet.
Detective Pikachu released shortly after on May 8, 2019, in Europe May 9, 2019, in South Korea, Hong Kong, Singapore, New Zealand, and Australia, and May 10, 2019, in China, UK, Ireland, Canada, and the US, in RealD 3D, Dolby Cinema, 4DX, and ScreenX formats.

Home media
Detective Pikachu was released on Digital HD on July 23, 2019, and was released on Ultra HD Blu-ray, Blu-ray and DVD on August 6, 2019.

The film debuted at the DVD and Blu-ray charts upon the week of its release, and was the second top-selling home video title in August 2019 (after Avengers: Endgame).

Reception

Box office
Detective Pikachu grossed $144.1 million in the United States and Canada, and $289.8 million in other territories, for a worldwide total of $433.9 million, against a production budget of $150 million.

In the United States and Canada, the film was released alongside Tolkien, Poms and The Hustle, and was projected to gross $50–70 million from 4,202 theaters. The film made  on its first day, including  from Thursday night previews, both records for a film based on a video game. Detective Pikachu went on to debut to $54.4 million, finishing second at the weekend box office behind holdover Avengers: Endgame, though it did top the Friday box office on its opening day. At the time, it was the best-ever opening for a video game film, (the record was broken the following year by Sonic the Hedgehog with $58 million) and was also the sixth-highest total for a film that did not debut number one at the box office. In its second weekend, the film made $24.8 million, finishing third behind John Wick: Chapter 3 – Parabellum and Avengers: Endgame, and then made $13.3 million in its third weekend, finishing fourth.

In other territories, the film was projected to debut to $90–120 million from 62 countries, including $40–60 million in China. Prior to its worldwide release, the film grossed  from openings and previews in several international markets, including Japan, through Thursday. The film had an international opening weekend debut of $103 million (and a five-day debut of $112.4 million), dethroning Avengers: Endgame at the top of the international box office. Detective Pikachu topped the international box office again in its second weekend. Despite breaking records, the film fell below expectations due to the high budget.

In Japan, the film opened at number three (behind Detective Conan: The Fist of Blue Sapphire and Avengers: Endgame), grossing  ($8.6 million) in its opening weekend, before topping the box office in its second weekend, with a cumulative  ($13,327,837). It topped the Chinese box office again in its second week, with a cumulative . In the United Kingdom, it topped the box office with a £4.9 million ($6.6 million) debut. , the film's largest international markets are China, Japan, the United Kingdom, Mexico, and Germany.

Critical response 

The website's critical consensus reads, "Pokémon Detective Pikachu may not take its wonderfully bizarre premise as far as it could have, but this offbeat adaptation should catch most – if not all – of the franchise's fans." It was the first international theatrical live-action video game adaptation to maintain a "fresh" rating and it was the highest rated video game adaptation on the site, until it was surpassed by The Angry Birds Movie 2. On Metacritic, it has a weighted average score of 53 out of 100, based on reviews from 48 critics, indicating "mixed or average reviews". Audiences polled by CinemaScore gave the film an average grade of "A−" on an A+ to F scale, while general audiences polled by PostTrak gave it 4 out of 5 stars.

Scott Mendelson of Forbes called the film "the best video game movie ever" and wrote, "Detective Pikachu works because it's a good movie first and a promising franchise-starter or a brand cash-in second. It's a real film, rooted in character arcs and narrative twists with just enough raw emotion and personal stakes to make the significant special effects moments matter beyond spectacle." CNET's Sean Keane called it the best film ever based on a video game, saying it achieves the balance of appealing to existing fans as well as potential new audiences. Keane praised Reynolds performance and called the film "an entertaining romp with plenty of heart". Clarisse Loughrey of The Independent gave the film 3/5 stars, noting the film's similarities to Who Framed Roger Rabbit and that it did not attempt to familiarize viewers with the franchise, but stated that it "feels more intriguing than it does derivative, and it’s a delight for fans to see how immersive this world actually feels." Simran Hans of The Observer gave the film 4/5 stars, writing: "What’s clever is the way this live-action spinoff exploits nostalgia for the family-friendly blockbusters of the late 1980s and the 1990s... rather than the Japanese “Pocket Monsters” themselves."

Writing for The Hollywood Reporter, Michael Rechtshaffen said, "Although the script... tends to compartmentalize the comedy, action and emotional bits rather than organically blending them all together, Letterman's energetic direction manages to hold everything aloft." Alonso Duralde's mixed review for TheWrap describes the film as feeling "both ambitious and lazy, frenzied and sluggish". Peter Debruge of Variety was critical of the plot and the special effects: "Though consistent with the games... the story of Detective Pikachu doesn't allow nearly enough Pokémon-related action, while the quality of the computer animation... falls far short of the basic level of competency audiences have come to expect from effects movies." Debruge was also critical of the central pairing of Pikachu and Tim Goodman, saying the relationship lacks chemistry. Kate Erbland of Indiewire gave the film a mixed review, praising the "awe-inspiring" visuals but criticizing the messy plot, saying that "no amount of technical polish can detract from a thin narrative that confuses far more than it amuses", and complaining that many of the best jokes were in the trailer.

Accolades

Sequel 
In January 2019, months ahead of the release of Detective Pikachu, Legendary Entertainment announced that a sequel was already in development, with Oren Uziel signed on as screenwriter. However, on May 3, 2021, Smith said on a sequel: "I think we have to just kind of bury our hopes. I don't think it's going to happen. I really hope so though.", while in October 2022, Kathryn Newton, admitted to being optimistic about a sequel, In February 2023, a representative from Legendary Entertainment said that a sequel is still "in active development." In March 2023, it was announced that Jonathan Krisel would direct the sequel and that Chris Galletta would rewrite the screenplay.

See also 
 List of films based on video games
 List of Pokémon films

Notes

References

External links 
 
 

2019 films
2019 3D films
2010s monster movies
American films with live action and animation
American detective films
Films about amnesia
Films directed by Rob Letterman
Films scored by Henry Jackman
Films shot at Shepperton Studios
Films shot in the United States
Films shot in Colorado
Films shot in Hampshire
Films shot in Hertfordshire
Films shot in England
Films shot in London
Films shot in Scotland
Films shot at Warner Bros. Studios, Leavesden
Films with screenplays by Derek Connolly
Films with screenplays by Nicole Perlman
Films with screenplays by Rob Letterman
IMAX films
Japanese detective films
Legendary Pictures films
Live-action films based on video games
Films using motion capture
Pokémon films
Warner Bros. films
Toho films
American children's adventure films
ScreenX films
4DX films
2010s English-language films